Subannularia is a genus of land snails with an operculum, terrestrial gastropod mollusks in the family Pomatiidae.

Species 
Species within the genus Subannularia include:
Subannularia jeannereti (Pfeiffer, 1861)
Subannularia lacheri (Pfeiffer, 1861)
Subannularia pujalsi Aguayo, 1953
Subannularia storchi (Pfeiffer, 1861)

References 

Pomatiidae